The 2014 World Club 7s was the second World Club 7s tournament, a rugby sevens competition organised by Premiership Rugby. It was hosted at Twickenham Stadium on 16 and 17 August 2014. The tournament was won by Buenos Aires.

Format
11 teams have been invited, and one has qualified for the competition through the 2014 Premiership Rugby Sevens Series contested by English and Welsh clubs.

The 12 teams are split into 3 pools of 4 teams, and each team will play all the others in their pool once on day one. Matches will be played according to International Rugby Board Laws of the Game - 7s Variations, and based on the result, teams will receive league points.

Following the completion of the pool stage, teams will be seeded based on league points and position in their respective pools. The top two teams from each pool, and the two best third place teams, will contest the cup competition. The remaining four teams will contest the shield competition.

These competitions take place on day two as knock-out competitions, with the winners progressing to the next stage at each round. However, the losers of the cup quarter-finals will instead drop down to contest a plate knock-out competition.

Teams

Pool Stage

Pool A

Pool B

Pool C

Knock-out Competition

Shield (Places 9-12)

Shield Semi-finals

Eleventh/Twelfth Place play-off

Shield Final

Cup Quarter-finals

Plate Competition (Places 5-8)

Plate Semi-finals

Seventh/Eighth Place play-off

Plate Final

Cup Competition

Cup Semi-finals

Third Place play-off

Cup Final

References

External links
Official website

2014 rugby sevens competitions
Rugby sevens competitions in England
2014–15 in English rugby union
Rugby union in London